Mezzana is a village in Tuscany, central Italy, administratively a frazione of the comune of San Giuliano Terme, province of Pisa.

Mezzana is about 7 km from Pisa and 6 km from San Giuliano Terme.

References

Bibliography 
 

Frazioni of the Province of Pisa